White Earth is a 2014 documentary film by J. Christian Jensen about new arrivals in White Earth, North Dakota who have moved there to seek work in the North Dakota oil boom. The film explores life in the oil boom through the eyes of four children and an immigrant mother. White Earth was nominated for the Academy Award for Best Documentary (Short Subject) at the 87th Academy Awards.

Awards and nominations

References

External links
 
 

2014 films
American short documentary films
2014 short documentary films
Documentary films about petroleum
Films shot in North Dakota
Films set in North Dakota
2010s English-language films
2010s American films